Şəkər (also spelled as Sheker, also transliterated as Шәкәр and شكر) is a village and municipality in Goychay Rayon of Azerbaijan. It has a current population of 1,299 people.

References 

Populated places in Goychay District